The Tschudi mine is a large copper mine located in the North of Namibia in Oshikoto Region. Tschudi represents one of the largest copper reserve in Namibia, having estimated reserves of 70 million tonnes of ore grading 0.7% copper.

See also
 Matchless Mine, Namibia

References 

Copper mines in Namibia
Buildings and structures in Oshikoto Region